ICTS International N.V. is a Dutch firm that develops products and provides consulting and personnel services in the field of aviation and general security. It was established in 1982, by former members of the Shin Bet, Israel's internal security agency, and El Al airline security agents. The company's shares are traded on OTCQB under the symbol ICTSF.

The firm and its subsidiaries specialize in aviation security services, operating airport checkpoints and electronic equipment, such as x-ray screening devices and manual devices, and verifying travel documents. Security services and consulting are also provided to other public and private transportation sectors. In 2014, the company employed 4,784 people with an annual sales revenue of US$173 million.

Subsidiaries
The main subsidiaries of ICTS International include the I-SEC international Security Group, Huntleigh USA and AU10TIX.

I-SEC specializes in the provision of advanced aviation security services worldwide, which include security consulting and security handling: security profiling, checkpoint screening, hold baggage screening ("HBS"), X-ray operator training and integrated services. I-SEC's management and key personnel are developers of pioneering aviation concepts, methods and technologies, focusing primarily on high-risk environments. I-SEC has operations in the Netherlands, Germany, Spain, Italy, Portugal, Japan and Russia. I-SEC was established in 2005 as the aviation security arm of the ICTS International. PI (Procheck International) is a subsidiary of I-SEC.

Huntleigh USA, the airline security and passenger screening company that was responsible for the passengers that boarded the flights at Boston and Newark prior to the 9/11 attacks, provides airport ground services in the US. Such services include charter flight and cargo security screening, aircraft search, guard services, airlines' agents, queue monitors, aircraft cleaning, ramp and below-the-wing services, skycap, wheelchair attendants, baggage handling, etc. Huntleigh USA is a wholly-owned subsidiary of ICTS, an Israeli company owned and operated by senior officers of the Mossad.

AU10TIX offers a front-end solution meeting the security and regulatory compliance requirements of the financial services sector, including Section 326 of the USA Patriot Act. AU10TIX's front-end solution incorporates unique features, such as dynamic questionnaire, developed on the basis of ICTS's experience in detection of suspicious signs and in advanced document checks.

Products and services
ICTS has used the security system employed in Israel, whereby passengers are profiled to assess the degree to which they pose a potential threat on the basis of a number of indicators, including age, name, origin and behavior during questioning. In the late 1990s, the firm also developed a product system based on a computerized algorithm called APS (Advanced Passenger Screening) which analyzes passenger information procured by airline companies and determines the potential risks posed by a given passenger. APS is used by most of the large airlines in the United States.

Another ICTS International product is Integrated Passenger Processing Solutions or IP@SS, a system that accelerates passenger flow while enhancing security. Automated TravelDoc is a system which performs automatic scans of travel documents to verify their authenticity and ensure they meet the requirements of the destination country. Another product is APIS Solution, a scanner that extracts data required by U.S. Customs automatically. ICTS International also produces a computer-based training system for X-ray operators that simulates potential workday situations.

Executive Officers
Executive Officers of ICTS International include Menachem J. Atzmon (Chairman of the Supervisory Board since 2004), Ran Langer (Managing Director since 2004), and Alon Raich (CFO since 2008). Atzmon holds controlling shares, owning more than 60% of ICTS International through a family trust.

Bibliography

See also
 Northern Virginia airport workers' strikes

References

Security companies of the Netherlands